John ("Jack") Arthur Gregory (22 June 1923 – ) was a British athlete who competed mainly in the 100 metres.

He competed for Great Britain in the 1948 Summer Olympics held in London, Great Britain in the 4 x 100 metre relay where he won the silver medal with his team mates Jack Archer, Alastair McCorquodale and Kenneth Jones.

Gregory was a top class rugby player.  Although he spent most his career playing for Bristol Rugby, he also played rugby league for Huddersfield and was banned by the RFU. He was reinstated in April 1948 and in January 1949 played his only game for England at rugby union in their defeat to Wales. His club side when capped for England was Blackheath.

External links

Scrum: Jack Gregory
 Bristol Rugby Legends: Jack Gregory

1923 births
2003 deaths
English male sprinters
Olympic silver medallists for Great Britain
Athletes (track and field) at the 1948 Summer Olympics
Athletes (track and field) at the 1952 Summer Olympics
Olympic athletes of Great Britain
Blackheath F.C. players
Bristol Bears players
English rugby union players
Wanderers F.C. (rugby union) players
England international rugby union players
Medalists at the 1948 Summer Olympics
Olympic silver medalists in athletics (track and field)